Anvil is a Canadian heavy metal band from Toronto, Ontario, formed in 1978. The band currently consists of founding members Steve "Lips" Kudlow (vocals, guitar), Robb Reiner (drums), and Chris Robertson (bass). As of 2022, the band has released nineteen studio albums, and has been cited as having influenced many notable heavy metal groups, including Megadeth, Slayer, Anthrax, and Metallica.

Reviewers have described Anvil as a pioneering heavy metal band that was popular in the 1980s but then faded into obscurity in the 1990s, while refusing to stop playing, recording, and gigging. Anvil's antics on and off stage, the setbacks they suffered, and their determination to keep going have been compared to the fictional band Spinal Tap.

History

Formation (1973–1981) 
Anvil began in April 1973 in Toronto, when high school friends Steve "Lips" Kudlow and Robb Reiner began playing music together. They met through a friend, guitarist and neighbour Marty Hoffman, but "musical differences" caused his departure after their first show. In 1978, the first full line-up of the band included Kudlow (lead vocals, lead guitar), Reiner (drums), Dave "Squirrely" Allison (rhythm guitar, backing vocals), and Ian "Dix" Dickson (bass). At this point, the band was called Lips.

Success in the 1980s (1981–1989) 
In 1981, the band released an independent album called Hard 'N' Heavy. Shortly after, they were signed by Attic Records and changed their name to Anvil. Their independent album was released by Attic as their debut album for the company. Following its release, British rock musician Lemmy asked Kudlow to play guitar for Motörhead, to replace "Fast" Eddie Clarke, but Kudlow declined. 

By 1983, Aerosmith manager David Krebs and assistant Paul O'Neill had signed a managing contract with Anvil and convinced Attic to release the band from its contract, so the band could sign with a major label. However, after initial interest, Krebs eventually stopped returning phone calls and did not get the band a major label recording contract; he released the band in mid-1986. 

In 1987 the band was signed by American label Metal Blade Records by William Howell, a fan who would become a DJ with KNAC radio. The band released three records with Metal Blade, starting with Strength of Steel, which was the group's most commercially successful record in the United States, peaking at No. 191 on the Billboard 200.

Obscurity (1990–2006) 
In 1991, Anvil was signed by Mausoleum Records which, in 1992, released their sixth album Worth the Weight. In 1996, they were signed by Hypnotic Records in Canada and Massacre Records in Germany. Hypnotic and Massacre released the albums, Plugged in Permanent (1996), Absolutely No Alternative (1997), Speed of Sound (1999), Plenty of Power (2001) and Still Going Strong (2002). These albums were not particularly well-received, and Kudlow stated that Anvil would not have continued had it not been for the German fans and the German contract, adding "We'll play gigs sometimes where there's no one there". 

In 1995, guitarist Sebastian Marino left the band to join Overkill. He was replaced by Ivan Hurd.

Anvil! The Story of Anvil documentary, and This Is Thirteen (2006–2009) 
In 2006, the band recorded with Chris Tsangarides, who produced their acclaimed 1982 album Metal on Metal. After failing to find a new label, the album, This Is Thirteen, was self-released in 2007, and was available exclusively from the band's website. Guitarist Ivan Hurd left the band at this point to settle down with his new wife, Anvil's former tour manager Tiziana Arrigoni.

In 2008, the band was the subject of the documentary film Anvil! The Story of Anvil, directed by the screenwriter and former Anvil roadie Sacha Gervasi. The film garnered critical acclaim from many major publications; Rolling Stone called it "the year's most praised rock doc." At the film's premiere, which took place at the 2008 Sundance Film Festival, the band played "Cat Scratch Fever" with Slash and Anthrax's Scott Ian.

The high praise for the movie put Anvil back into the public consciousness, and brought the band opening slots with AC/DC and Saxon, plus appearances at major festivals, including the Download, Hellfest, Bumbershoot and SXSW. 

Following the success of the Anvil documentary, VH1 Classic Records re-released This Is Thirteen on CD and vinyl on September 15, 2009, with a newly recorded song, "Thumb Hang", which had been written by the band during the 1980s. The double-vinyl LP contains re-recorded versions of Anvil classics "Metal on Metal" and "666".

In 2009, Bantam Press released the book Anvil: The Story of Anvil, authored by Kudlow and Reiner with a foreword by Slash. On March 28, 2009, Kudlow and Reiner were the featured guests on VH1 Classic's That Metal Show. Anvil played the Rocklahoma festival in Pryor, Oklahoma in 2009, and opened for AC/DC at their first few summer Black Ice World Tour shows (North American leg II). They also supported Saxon on a leg of UK shows in November.

Anvil appeared on The Tonight Show with Conan O'Brien on October 6, 2009, the first network television appearance of their career, to coincide with the release of Anvil! The Story Of Anvil on DVD in North America; on the show, the band performed "Metal on Metal".

On October 8, 2009, Anvil filmed a cameo performance in a rock club for The Green Hornet.

2010–present 

From June to July 2010, Anvil went on a tour of Europe, selling out venues in the UK, Spain, Belgium, Switzerland, Germany, and the Netherlands, as well as festivals in Finland, Sweden, France, Italy and Germany. 

The band released Juggernaut of Justice, their 14th studio album, on May 10, 2011, care of The End Records.

Following the release of the album the band completed yet more tours in Europe and North America, often playing alongside artists such as Alice Cooper and Saxon. The band released a new greatest hits album Monument of Metal: The Very Best of Anvil. Anvil also started re-releasing their old material, starting with Strength of Steel, Pound For Pound, and Worth the Weight later that same year.

In January 2012, bassist Glenn Gyorffy quit Anvil, citing creative differences. He was replaced by Sal Italiano, late of Iron Maiden tribute band Live After Death.  

Anvil embarked on a 2012 Winter Tour of the US and, in May 2013, released Hope in Hell, a studio recording produced by Bob Marlette. Kudlow said that in some songs he was inspired by his love of heavy rock'n'roll, which made him feel he "found his way home", to the time when they did their first record. In an interview with The Drummer's Journal, Lips outlined how the record was written "as if it was 1983 again." At this point, the band had signed with Steamhammer, which would release its next two albums. Anvil toured to promote the new album; they opened for Metallica in Singapore, played Wacken Open Air in Germany, swung through Australia and, in 2014, went on an extensive US tour.

In 2014, Raven Banner Entertainment released Louder Than Hell: Wacken, The Movie, a collector's edition DVD of the Wacken concert, featuring Alice Cooper, Anthrax, Anvil, Annihilator, Deep Purple, Henry Rollins, Lamb of God, Motörhead, Rammstein and Trivium. Also in 2014, Anvil parted ways with Sal Italiano and replaced him with Chris Robertson, who was already acting as the band's rehearsal bassist and a member of their road crew.

The album Anvil Is Anvil was released on February 26, 2016; the band toured Europe and Japan in support of it. Anvil continued touring as its seventeenth album, Pounding the Pavement, was released on January 19, 2018. 

Anvil's 18th album, Legal at Last, was released on February 14, 2020, by AFM Records. On May 20, 2022, Anvil's 19th album Impact Is Imminent was released.

On January 1, 2023, former guitarist Sebastian Marino died at the age of 57.

Members

Current
 Steve "Lips" Kudlow – guitars, lead vocals (1978–present)
 Robb "Robbo" Reiner – drums (1978–present)
 Chris Robertson – bass, backing vocals (2014–present)

Former
 Dave "Squirrely" Allison – guitars, backing vocals (1978–1989)
 Ian "Dix" Dickson – bass (1978–1993)
 Sebastian Marino – guitars (1989–1995, died 2023)
 Mike Duncan – bass (1993–1996)
 Ivan Hurd – guitars (1995–2007)
 Glenn "Glenn Five" Gyorffy – bass, backing vocals (1996–2012)
 Sal Italiano – bass (2012–2014)

Timeline

Discography

Studio albums
 Hard 'n' Heavy (1981, Attic Records)
 Metal on Metal (1982, Attic Records)
 Forged in Fire (1983, Attic Records)
 Strength of Steel (1987, Metal Blade Records, Enigma Records)
 Pound for Pound (1988, Metal Blade Records, Enigma Records)
 Worth the Weight (1992, Maximum Records)
 Plugged in Permanent (1996, Hypnotic Records)
 Absolutely No Alternative (1997, Massacre Records)
 Speed of Sound (1999, Massacre Records)
 Plenty of Power (2001, Massacre Records)
 Still Going Strong (2002, Massacre Records)
 Back to Basics (2004, Massacre Records)
 This Is Thirteen (2007, self-released)
 Juggernaut of Justice (2011, The End Records)
 Hope in Hell (2013, Steamhammer)
 Anvil Is Anvil (2016, Steamhammer)
 Pounding the Pavement (2018, Steamhammer)
 Legal at Last (2020, AFM Records)
 Impact Is Imminent (2022, AFM Records)

Live albums
 Past and Present – Live in Concert (1989, Metal Blade Records, Roadracer Records)

Compilation albums
 Backwaxed (1985, Viper Records)
 Molten Masterpieces (1989, Attic Records)
 Massacre's Classix Shape Edition (1999, Massacre Records)
 Anthology of Anvil (2000, Hypnotic Records)
 Monument of Metal (2011, The End Records)

Singles & EPs
 School Love (1981, Polydor Records)
 Anvil (1982, self-produced)
 Stop Me/Tease Me, Please Me (1982, Attic Records)
 Metal on Metal (1982, Attic Records)
 Forged in Fire (1983, Attic Records)
 Make It Up to You (1983, Attic Records)
 Blood on the Ice (1988, Metal Blade Records, Enigma Records)
 Juggernaut of Justice (2011, The End Records)
 Daytrotter Session (2012, Daytrotter)
 Hope in Hell (2013, Steamhammer)
 Flying (2013, Steamhammer)
 Mankind Machine (2013, Steamhammer)
 Nabbed in Nebraska (2019, AFM Records)
 Legal at Last (2019, AFM Records)

Other media 
Books
 Anvil: The Story of Anvil by Steve Kudlow and Robb Reiner (Foreword by Slash) Bantam Press (March 13, 2009) 

Film
 Anvil! The Story of Anvil, a documentary by Sacha Gervasi, filmed from late 2005 to 2007.

References

External links 

 
 
 
 
 Article at thecanadianencyclopedia.ca
 2013 Anvil interview with The Drummer's Journal

Canadian heavy metal musical groups
Canadian speed metal musical groups
Musical groups from Toronto
Musical groups established in 1978
Attic Records (Canada) artists
Articles which contain graphical timelines
1978 establishments in Ontario
Canadian thrash metal musical groups